The Snow Towers is a  glaciated mountain summit located in the Boundary Ranges of the Coast Mountains, in the U.S. state of Alaska. The mountain was named by members of the Juneau Icefield Research Project in 1964, and was officially adopted in 1965 by the U.S. Board on Geographic Names. The first ascent was made in 1984 by Charles "Dick" Ellsworth and Bruce Tickell.

Climate

Based on the Köppen climate classification, The Snow Towers is located in a subpolar oceanic climate zone, with long, cold, wet winters, and cool summers. Most weather fronts originate in the Pacific Ocean, and travel east toward the Coast Mountains where they are forced upward by the range (Orographic lift), causing them to drop their moisture in the form of rain or snowfall. As a result, the Coast Mountains experience high precipitation, especially during the winter months in the form of snowfall. Temperatures can drop below −20 °C with wind chill factors below −30 °C. The months May and June offer the most favorable weather for viewing this peak.

See also

Geospatial summary of the High Peaks/Summits of the Juneau Icefield
Geography of Alaska

References

External links
 The Snow Towers weather forecast

Mountains of Alaska
Mountains of Juneau, Alaska
Boundary Ranges
North American 2000 m summits